Bruce Bickford may refer to:

 Bruce Bickford (animator) (1947–2019), American maker of animated films 
 Bruce Bickford (athlete) (born 1957), American long-distance runner
 Bruce Bickford (politician), member of the Maine House of Representatives